Eastanollee  is an unincorporated community in Stephens County, in the U.S. state of Georgia.

History
The first settlement at Eastanollee was made in the late 18th century. The community takes its name from nearby Eastanollee Creek. A variant name was "Eastanolee". A post office called Eastanollee has been in operation since 1875.

References

Unincorporated communities in Stephens County, Georgia
Unincorporated communities in Georgia (U.S. state)